Eicochrysops antoto is a butterfly in the family Lycaenidae. It is found in Ethiopia.

References

Endemic fauna of Ethiopia
Butterflies described in 1911
Eicochrysops